The 2011 Libyan rape allegations refer to allegations that Gaddafi's forces in Libya were committing mass rape during the 2011 Libyan civil war. Prosecutor of the International Criminal Court Luis Moreno Ocampo said "we have information that there was a policy to rape in Libya those who were against the government." Libyan psychologist Seham Sergiwa said she distributed questionnaires in opposition-held areas and along the Libya–Tunisia border, and 259 women responded that they were raped. Sergiwa told Amnesty International's specialist on Libya that she had lost contact with the 140 victims she interviewed and was unable to provide documentary evidence. In March 2011, Iman al-Obeidi said she was gang-raped before Libyan security services dragged her away.

Investigations by Amnesty International, Human Rights Watch and Doctors Without Borders did not find first-hand evidence that mass rapes had occurred. Amnesty International's senior crisis response adviser said although no evidence was found, this did not prove that mass rape did not occur.

2011 allegations
Allegations arose in 2011 that Viagra and other impotency drugs were being distributed by Gaddafi to sustain the rapes. The charges were denied by Libyan diplomats and described as propaganda. Libyan psychologist Seham Sergiwa reported a wide pattern of rapes by Libyan government soldiers during the 2011 conflict. In June 2011, the International Criminal Court began an investigation into the rape allegations seeking to add the rapes to Gaddafi's list of war crimes charges.

United States secretary of state Hillary Clinton, stated that "rape, physical intimidation, sexual harassment, and even so-called 'virginity tests' have taken place in countries throughout the region." Clinton also stated that "It is an affront to all people who are yearning to live in a society free from violence with respect for basic human rights.  We urge all governments to conduct immediate, transparent investigations into these allegations, and to hold accountable those found responsible."

In April 2011 NBC News reported that United States ambassador, Susan Rice, told a closed-door meeting of officials at the UN that the Libyan military is using rape as a weapon in the war with the rebels and some had been issued the anti-impotency drug. United States military and intelligence officials informed NBC News under condition of anonymity that there was no evidence for the allegations of systematic rape.

Patrick Cockburn expressed concern that misleading reports of rapes by Libyan government forces were used to justify the NATO-led 2011 military intervention in Libya. In June 2011, the UN investigator M. Cherif Bassiouni did not find evidence of mass rapes.

Post-war
After the civil war, Luis Moreno-Ocampo, prosecutor for the International Criminal Court, said there was evidence that Gaddafi told soldiers to rape women who had spoken out against his government.

In 2014, the new Libyan government said that compensation should be paid for the victims of rape during the war.

In 2016, there were reports that African women were being raped by the same Libyan rebels who overthrew Gadhafi.  This is part of a larger picture of abuse of black Africans in Libya that is emerging in the wake of the rebel victory, born of allegations that Gadhafi often hired sub-Saharan Africans to fight for him.

In 2019, leaked phone calls by Gaddafi government officials were claimed by The Libya Observer as evidence that Baghdadi Mahmudi, prime minister of Libya from 2006 to 2011, had coordinated systematic rapes.

See also
 Wartime sexual violence
 Human rights violations in the 2011 Libyan Civil War

References

Bibliography

External links

First Libyan Civil War
Wartime sexual violence
Propaganda legends
Rape in Libya